Amcinafide (developmental code name SQ-15112), also known as triamcinolone acetophenide, is a synthetic glucocorticoid corticosteroid which was never marketed.

References

Acetophenides
Corticosteroid cyclic ketals
Diols
Fluoroarenes
Glucocorticoids
Pregnanes
Abandoned drugs